The 2017 Northeast Conference men's soccer season was the 37th season of men's varsity soccer in the conference.

The St. Francis Brooklyn Terriers are the defending regular season and tournament champions. For 2017, St. Francis Brooklyn repeated as Regular Season Championship by going 6-0-1 in conference play. Dating back to last year, St. Francis Brooklyn has gone undefeated in two seasons of conference play recording a 12-0-2 record.

Changes from 2016 

 None

Teams 

Notes:

All records, appearances, titles, etc. are from time with current school only.
Year at school includes 2017 season.
Overall and NEC records are from time at current school and are before the beginning of the season.

Preseason
After winning its third Northeast Conference (NEC) men’s soccer championship in the last four seasons, St. Francis Brooklyn was unanimously picked by the league’s head coaches to win again in 2017. Saint Francis (PA) was tabbed second in the preseason poll.

Rankings

() first place votes

Regular season
After starting the season undefeated, Fairleigh Dickinson, received 2 votes to be ranked in the week 2 NSCAA Division I poll. For the week 3 and 4 polls, FDU was nationally ranked at 21.

The Saint Francis Red Flash defeated 20th ranked Old Dominion, 5–3. It was SFU's first win over a nationally-ranked opponent since defeating No. 7 Monmouth 2-0 on Oct. 25, 2009.

Collectively, NEC teams finished 28–43–8 against non-conference opponents for 2017.

All times Eastern time.† denotes Homecoming game

Week 1 (Aug 21-27) 

Schedule and results:

Players of the week:

Week 2 (Aug 28-Sept 3) 

Schedule and results:

 
Players of the week:

Week 3 (Sept 4-Sept 10) 

Schedule and results:

 
Players of the week:

Week 4 (Sept 11-Sept 17) 

Schedule and results:

 
Players of the week:

Week 5 (Sept 18-Sept 24) 

Schedule and results:

Players of the week:

Week 6 (Sept 25-Oct 1) 

Schedule and results:

Players of the week:

Week 7 (Oct 2-Oct 8) 

Schedule and results:

Players of the week:

Week 8 (Oct 9-Oct 15) 

Schedule and results:

Players of the week:

Week 9 (Oct 16-Oct 22) 

Schedule and results:

Players of the week:

Week 10 (Oct 23-Oct 29) 

Schedule and results:

Players of the week:

Week 11 (Oct 30-Nov 5) 

Schedule and results:

Players of the week:

Rankings

NSCAA national

NSCAA northeast region

NEC play results

All-NEC awards and teams

Postseason

NEC tournament

NCAA tournament

See also 
 2017 NCAA Division I men's soccer season
 2017 Northeast Conference Men's Soccer Tournament
 2017 Northeast Conference women's soccer season

References 

 
2017 NCAA Division I men's soccer season